Mercury 1 or variants may refer to:

 Mercury 1, a spacecraft of Project Mercury
 Mercury(I), an oxidation state of the element Mercury
Mercury One, a non-profit organisation founded by Glenn Beck
 Mercury I, a version of the Blackburn Mercury early British aircraft
 Mercury I, a 1926 version of the Bristol Mercury aircraft engine

See also
 Mercury (disambiguation)
Mercury-Redstone 1, a 1960 space flight test
Mercury-Redstone 1A
Mercury-Atlas 1, a 1960 space flight test
Mercury-Scout 1, a 1961 spacecraft